Walter Edward Hart Massey (August 19, 1928 – August 4, 2014) was a American actor, best known for voicing Tubby's Dad on the animated series The Little Lulu Show, Principal Herbert Haney on the animated series Arthur and The Doctor in the American English version of The Mysterious Cities of Gold. He was based in Montreal, Quebec.

He played Dr. Donald Stewart on the 1990s version of Lassie, and had numerous roles on stage, and in films and television, for more than six decades. Massey was the cousin of actor Raymond Massey and was a founding member of Canadian Actors' Equity.

Walter Massey's father, Denton, was an engineer and Ontario politician.

Massey died in Montreal, Quebec on August 4, 2014, fifteen days before his 86th birthday.

Awards 
In 1988, the Canadian Actors' Equity Association voted him the Larry McCance Award for his service to the organization. He was also presented with the Montreal ACTRA Award of Excellence in 2007.

Filmography 

Now That April's Here (1958) – John Williams
A Cool Sound from Hell (1959) – Pilot
The Unforeseen (1960)
The Unpredictable Leader (1965)
Seaway (1965) – Himself
Illegal Abortion (1966)
Don't Let the Angels Fall (1969) – Police Sergeant
Espolio (1970)
Loving and Laughing (1971)
Dr. Simon Locke (1971) – Ed
Family Court (1971) – Court Clerk
Our Land is Our Life (1974)
The Heatwave Lasted Four Days (1975)
The 1 CAG Story (1977) – Narrator
Duplessis (1977) – George Marler
Blood Relatives (1978) – Mr. Lowery
Jacob Two-Two Meets the Hooded Fang (1978) – Father
Canada Vignettes: Hudden and Dudden and Donald O'Neary (1978)
Tomorrow Never Comes (1978) – Sergeant
Two Solitudes (1978)
Legends and Life of the Inuit (1978)
Soils of Canada (1978)
Bravery in the Field (1979) – Policeman in Hospital
Amber Waves (1980)
Astro Boy (1980) – Peter's Owner (Cinelume Dub)
Agency (1980) – Minister
Acting Class (1980) – Narrator
Under New Management (1981) – Narrator
Happy Birthday to Me (1981) – Conventioneer Leader
Gas (1981) – Major Bright
Ulysses 31 (1981) – Aeolus (English Version)
Black Mirror (1981) – Julie's Father
The Concert Man (1982) – Narrator
Hard Feelings (1982) – Mr. Fitch
The Mysterious Cities of Gold (1982) – Captain Perez/The Doctor (English Version)
Cook & Peary: The Race to the Pole (1983) – Theodore Roosevelt
Snow Job (1983) – Guest Appearance
Belle and Sebastian (1984) – Inspector Garcia
Evil Judgement (1984) – Ron/Robertson
Mrs. Soffel (1984) – District Attorney
The Hotel New Hampshire (1984) – Texan
Discussions in Bioethics: Happy Birthday (1985)
Caffe Italia Montréal (1985)
Blue Line (1985) – Father
Breaking All the Rules (1985) – Charlie
The Blue Man (1985) – John Westmore
Zombie Nightmare (1986) – Mr. Peters
The Boy in Blue (1986) – Mayor
Spearfield's Daughter (1986) – Bronowski
Dead Man's Letters (1986) – English Voiceover
Le Dernier Havre (1986)
Making Transitions (1986) – Narrator
Ford: The Man and the Machine (1987)
Shades of Love: Lilac Dream (1987) – Ezra
First Journey: Fort William (1987) – Narrator
Night Zoo (1987) – Mr. Chagnon
The Morning Man (1987)
Future Block (1987)
Diplodos (1987) – Additional Voices
Adventures of the Little Koala (1987) – Papa/Dr. Nose
The Wonderful Wizard of Oz (1987) – Uncle Henry
The Gnomes' Great Adventure (1987) – The Man
The World of David the Gnome (1987) – King Conrad/Pondent/Walter/Paul/Various Gnomes
Bobobobs (1988) – Captain Bob Wouter
The Smoggies (1988) – Clarence
Of Dice and Men (1988)
Malarek (1988) – Judge
No Blame (1988) – Mr. Donaldson
State Park (1988) – Rancewell
Lance et compte II (1988) – Bill Simpson
Red Earth, White Earth (1989) – Doc
The Twilight Zone (1989) – Professor
Snake Eater II: The Drug Buster (1989) – Judge
Jacknife (1989) – Ed Buckman
Bumpety Boo (1989) – Additional Voices
Nutsberry Town (1989) – Mr. Walnut
Maya the Bee (1989) – Old Man
Baron Münchhausen in a Whale of a Tale: A German Legend (1989) – Narrator/Baron Münchhausen
Whispers (1990) – Bank Manager
The Littl' Bits (1990) – Narrator
Jungle Book Shonen Mowgli (1990) – Akela, Alexander
Sharky and George (1990) – Additional Voices
The Little Flying Bears (1990) – Plato
The Adventures of Peter Pan (1990) – Additional Voices
Saban's Adventures of Pinocchio (1990) – Geppetto
Saban's Adventures of the Little Mermaid (1991) – Additional Voices
Jungle Tales (1991)
Second Debut (1991)
Bob in a Bottle (1991) – Additional Voices
C.L.Y.D.E. (1991) – Piers McMaster
Samurai Pizza Cats (1991) – Guru Lou
The Hidden Room (1991) – Grandpa
Nelligan (1991) – Lord Van Horne
The Real Story of O Christmas Tree (1991) – Santa Claus
Canada Strikes Oil: Leduc, Alberta 1947 (1991) – Narrator
On Strike: The Winnipeg General Strike, 1919 (1991)
Double or Nothing: The Rise and Fall of Robert Campeau (1992)
Are You Afraid of the Dark? (1992) – Grandpa Samuel/Bob McGorrill
Armen and Bullik (1992) – Le capitaine North
La conquête de l'Amérique I (1992)
The Bush Baby (1992) – Professor Crankshaw
Sandokan (1992) – Additional Voices
Gulliver's Travels (1992) – Additional Voices
Favorite Songs (1992)
Christopher Columbus (1992) – Additional Voices
Spirou (1992) – Additional Voices
David Copperfield (1993) – Doctor
Papa Beaver's Storytime (1993) – Papa Beaver
The Busy World of Richard Scarry (1993–1997) – Mr. Gronkle (2nd voice)
Cat Tales (1994) – The Horse
The Maharaja's Daughter (1994) – Dr. Donnelly
Mrs. Parker and the Vicious Circle (1994) – Phillip the Producer
Sirens (1994) – Security Guard/James Tambor
Hart to Hart: Two Harts in 3/4 Time (1995) – Herb Hall
Robinson Sucroe (1995)
The Little Lulu Show (1996–1998) – Mr. Jim Tompkins (Tubby's Dad)
Arthur (1996–2014) – Principal Herbert Haney
Night Hood (1996) – Inspector Ganimard
How the Toys Saved Christmas (1996) – Mr. Tinkler
Space Cases (1996) – Julian Mrtz
Animal Crackers (1997) – Additional Voices
The Country Mouse and the City Mouse Adventures (1997) – Additional Voices
Caillou (1997) – Additional Voices
Patrol 03 (1997) – Additional Voices
Lassie (1997–1999) – Dr. Stewart
Ripley's Believe It or Not! (1998) – Additional Voices
Eye of the Wolf (1998)
Bonanno: A Godfather's Story (1999), released in the U.S. under the title, The Youngest Godfather – Don Calo Schiro
Tommy and Oscar (1999)
Monet: Shadow and Light (1999) – Leduc
Dead Silent (1999) – Nate Henderson
Waking the Dead (2000) – Otto Ellis
For Better or For Worse (2000) – Additional Voices
Charley and Mimmo (2000) – Grandpa
Upstairs, Downstairs Bears (2000) – Dr. Fozzbury
A Miss Mallard Mystery (2000) – Additional Voices
Wunschpunsch (2000) – Additional Voices
The Man Who Talks with Wolves (2001)
Varian's War (2001) – Sydney
Galidor: Defenders of the Outer Dimension (2002) – Nepol
Arthur, It's Only Rock and Roll (2002) – Principal Herbert Haney
The Stork Derby (2002) – Mr. Walden
Caillou's Holiday Movie (2003) – Santa
Tripping the Rift (2004) – Additional Voices
Billy and Buddy (2004) – Grandpa
The Legend of the Christmas Tree (2005) – Priest
The Greatest Game Ever Played (2005) – President Taft
Dr. Norman Bethune (2006) – Grandfather Bethune
My First Wedding (2006) – Father James
My Daughter's Secret (2007) – Tom
A Dennis the Menace Christmas (2007) – Wilbur Newman
Tripping the Rift: The Movie (2008) – Additional Voices
Secrets of the Summer House (2008) – George III Wickersham
The Velveteen Rabbit (2009) – Dr. Kennedy
Sleeping Beauty (2023) – Narrator

See also 
 Massey family

References

External links 

1928 births
2014 deaths
Anglophone Quebec people
Canadian male film actors
Canadian male voice actors
Canadian male television actors
Male actors from Montreal
Male actors from Toronto
20th-century Canadian male actors
21st-century Canadian male actors